Lindsay Gordon Anderson (17 April 1923 – 30 August 1994) was a British feature-film, theatre and documentary director, film critic, and leading-light of the Free Cinema movement and of the British New Wave. He is most widely remembered for his 1968 film if...., which won the Palme d'Or at Cannes Film Festival in 1969 and marked Malcolm McDowell's cinematic debut.
He is also notable, though not a professional actor, for playing a minor role in the Academy Award-winning 1981 film Chariots of Fire. McDowell produced a 2007 documentary about his experiences with Anderson, Never Apologize.

Early life 
Lindsay Gordon Anderson was born in Bangalore, South India, where his father had been stationed with the Royal Engineers, on 17 April 1923. His father Captain (later Major General) Alexander Vass Anderson was a British Army officer who had been born in North India, and his mother Estelle Bell Gasson was born in Queenstown, South Africa, the daughter of a wool merchant. Lindsay's parents separated in 1926 and Estelle returned to England with her sons; however, they tried to reconcile in 1932 in Bangalore, and when Estelle returned to England she was pregnant with her third son, Alexander Vass Anderson. The Andersons divorced and Estelle remarried Major Cuthbert Sleigh in 1936. Lindsay's father remarried in India; although Gavin Lambert writes, in Mainly About Lindsay Anderson: A Memoir (Faber and Faber, 2000, p. 18), that Alexander Vass Anderson 'cut (his first family) out of his life', making no reference to them in his Who's Who entry, Lindsay often saw his father and looked after his house and dogs when he was away.

Both Lindsay and his older brother Murray Anderson (1919–2016) were educated at Saint Ronan's School in Worthing, West Sussex, and at Cheltenham College. It was at Cheltenham that Lindsay had met his lifelong friend and biographer, the screenwriter and novelist Gavin Lambert. Lindsay won a scholarship for classical studies at Wadham College at the University of Oxford, in 1942.

Anderson served in the Army from 1943 until 1946, first with the 60th King's Royal Rifle Corps, and then in the final year of World War II as a cryptographer for the Intelligence Corps, at the Wireless Experimental Centre in Delhi. Anderson assisted in nailing the Red flag to the roof of the Junior Officers' mess in Annan Parbat, in August 1945, after the victory of the Labour Party in the general election was confirmed. The colonel did not approve, he recalled a decade later, but no disciplinary action was taken against them.

Lindsay returned to Oxford in 1946 but changed from classical studies to English; he graduated in 1948.

Career

Film criticism 
Before going into film-making, Anderson was a prominent film critic writing for the influential Sequence magazine (1947–52), which he co-founded with Gavin Lambert, Peter Ericsson and Karel Reisz; later writing for the British Film Institute's journal Sight and Sound and the left-wing political weekly the New Statesman. In a 1956 polemical article, "Stand Up, Stand Up" for Sight and Sound, he attacked contemporary critical practices, in particular the pursuit of objectivity. Taking as an example some comments made by Alistair Cooke in 1935, where Cooke claimed to be without politics as a critic, Anderson responded:

Following a series of screenings which he and the National Film Theatre programmer Karel Reisz organized for the venue of independently produced short films by himself and others, he developed a philosophy of cinema which found expression in what became known, by the late-1950s, as the Free Cinema movement. This was the belief that the British cinema must break away from its class-bound attitudes and that non-metropolitan Britain ought to be shown on the nation's screens. He had already begun to make films himself, starting in 1948 with Meet the Pioneers, a documentary about a conveyor-belt factory.

Filmmaking 
Along with Karel Reisz, Tony Richardson, and others, he secured funding from a variety of sources (including Ford of Britain) and they each made a series of short documentaries on a variety of subjects. One of Anderson's early short films, Thursday's Children (1954), concerning the education of deaf children, made in collaboration with Guy Brenton, a friend from his Oxford days, won an Oscar for Best Documentary Short in 1954. Thursday's Children was preserved by the Academy Film Archive in 2005.

These films, influenced by one of Anderson' heroes, the French filmmaker Jean Vigo, and made in the tradition of the British documentaries of Humphrey Jennings, foreshadowed much of the social realism of British cinema that emerged in the next decade, with Reisz's Saturday Night and Sunday Morning (1960), Richardson's The Loneliness of the Long Distance Runner (1962) and Anderson's own This Sporting Life (1963), produced by Reisz. Anderson's film met with mixed reviews at the time, and was not a commercial success.

Anderson is perhaps best remembered as a filmmaker for his "Mick Travis trilogy", all of which star Malcolm McDowell as the title character: if.... (1968), a satire on public schools; O Lucky Man! (1973) a Pilgrim's Progress inspired road movie; and Britannia Hospital (1982), a fantasia taking stylistic influence from the populist wing of British cinema represented by Hammer horror films and Carry On comedies.

In 1981, Anderson played the role of the Master of Caius College at Cambridge University in the film Chariots of Fire.

Anderson developed an acquaintance from 1950 with John Ford, which led to what has come to be regarded as one of the standard books on that director, Anderson's About John Ford (1983). Based on half a dozen meetings over more than two decades, and a lifetime's study of the man's work, the book has been described as "One of the best books published by a film-maker on a film-maker".

In 1985, producer Martin Lewis invited Anderson to chronicle Wham!'s visit to China, among the first-ever visits by Western pop artists, which resulted in Anderson's film Foreign Skies: Wham! In China. He admitted in his diary on 31 March 1985, to having "no interest in Wham!", or China, and he was simply "'doing this for the money'". In 1986, he was a member of the jury at the 36th Berlin International Film Festival.

Anderson was also a significant British theatre director. He was long associated with London's Royal Court Theatre, where he was Co-Artistic Director 1969–70, and Associate Artistic Director 1971–75, directing premiere productions of plays by David Storey, among others.

In 1992, as a close friend of actresses Jill Bennett and Rachel Roberts, Anderson included a touching episode in his autobiographical BBC film Is That All There Is?, with a boat trip down the River Thames (several of their professional colleagues and friends aboard) to scatter their ashes on the waters while musician Alan Price sang the song "Is That All There Is?".

Every year, the International Documentary Festival in Amsterdam (IDFA) gives an acclaimed filmmaker the chance to screen his or her personal Top 10 favorite films. In 2007, Iranian filmmaker Maziar Bahari selected O Dreamland and Every Day Except Christmas (1957), a record of a day in the old Covent Garden market, for his top 10 classics from the history of documentary.[3]

Personal life 
Gavin Lambert's memoir, Mainly About Lindsay Anderson, wrote that Anderson was homosexual and repressed his orientation, which was seen as a betrayal by his other friends. In November 2006 Malcolm McDowell told The Independent that he believed Anderson was gay, and said:

Death 
Anderson died from a heart attack on 30 August 1994 at the age of 71.

Theatre productions 
All Royal Court, London, unless otherwise indicated:

 The Waiting of Lester Abbs (Kathleen Sully, 1957)
 The Long and the Short and the Tall (Willis Hall, 1959)
 Progress to the Park (Alun Owen, 1959)
 The Trial of Cob and Leach/Jazzetry (Christopher Logue, 1959)
 Serjeant Musgrave's Dance (John Arden, 1959)
 The Lily White Boys (Harry Cookson and Christopher Logue, 1960)
 Trials by Logue: Antigone/Cob and Leach (Christopher Logue, 1960)
 Diary of a Madman (Gogol adaptation, 1963)
 Box and Cox (John Maddison Morton, 1961)
 The Fire Raisers (Max Frisch, 1961)
 Julius Caesar  (William Shakespeare, 1964)
 Andorra (Max Frisch, National Theatre at the Old Vic, 1964)
 The Cherry Orchard (Anton Chekhov, Chichester Festival Theatre, 1966)
 Inadmissible Evidence (John Osborne, Teatr Współczesny, Warsaw, 1966)
 The Contractor (David Storey, 1969)
 Home (David Storey, also Morosco Theatre NY, 1970)
 The Changing Room (David Storey, 1971)
 The Farm  (David Storey, 1973)
 Life Class  (David Storey, 1974)
 In Celebration  (David Storey 1974)
 What the Butler Saw (Joe Orton, 1975)
 The Seagull (Anton Chekhov, Lyric Theatre, 1975); in repertory with
 The Bed Before Yesterday (Ben Travers, Lyric Theatre, 1975)
 The Kingfisher (William Douglas Home, Lyric Theatre 1977, Biltmore NY, 1978)
 Alice's Boys (Felicity Brown and Jonathan Hayes, Savoy Theatre, 1978)
 Early Days (David Storey, National Cottesloe Theatre, 1980)
Hamlet theatre royal Stratford east.
 The Holly and the Ivy (Wynyard Browne, Roundabout New York, 1982)
 The Cherry Orchard (Anton Chekhov, Theatre Royal Haymarket, 1983)
 The Playboy of the Western World (John Millington Synge, 1984)
 In Celebration revival (David Storey, Manhattan Theatre Club, NY, 1984)
 Holiday (Philip Barry, Old Vic, 1987)
 The March on Russia (David Storey, National Lyttelton Theatre, 1989)
 The Fishing Trip (Frank Grimes, Warehouse Theatre, 1991)
 Stages (David Storey, National Cottesloe Theatre, 1992)

Filmography

Films

Television

Documentary short films

Acting

See also 
 Kitchen sink realism
 Jill Bennett

References

Bibliography 
 About John Ford (1983) 
 The Diaries of Lindsay Anderson ed. Paul Sutton (2004) 
 Never Apologise: The Collected Writings of Lindsay Anderson (2004) 
 Six English Filmmakers (2014)  - Anderson and his colleagues in conversation with Sutton.

External links 
Lindsay Anderson – A Celebration

The Lindsay Anderson Memorial Foundation

Watch O Dreamland on FourDocs
The BFI's "screenonline" on Free Cinema
The BFI's "screenonline" for Lindsay Anderson
The Lindsay Anderson Archive at Stirling University, Scotland
Lindsay Anderson Bibliography (via UC Berkeley)

1923 births
1994 deaths
English people of Scottish descent
British film directors
British experimental filmmakers
British film critics
People educated at Cheltenham College
Alumni of Wadham College, Oxford
British Army personnel of World War II
Film directors from Bangalore
Directors of Palme d'Or winners
King's Royal Rifle Corps soldiers
Intelligence Corps soldiers
Military personnel of British India